Endecatomus rugosus is a species of beetle in the family Endecatomidae. It is found in North America.

References

Further reading

External links

 

Bostrichoidea
Articles created by Qbugbot
Beetles described in 1838